Vladimir Aleksandrovich Pisarsky (born 27 February 1996) is a Ukrainian-born Russian football player, who plays as a centre-forward for Russian Premier League side Krylia Sovetov Samara. He was known as Vladimir Aleksandrovich Sychevoy until December 2022.

Club career
He made his debut in the Russian Football National League for FC Irtysh Omsk on 13 October 2020 in a game against FC Akron Tolyatti.

Sychevoy made his Russian Premier League debut for FC Orenburg on 16 July 2022 against PFC Krylia Sovetov Samara. In his second RPL game a week later against FC Ural Yekaterinburg, he came on as a substitute at half-time and scored a hat-trick in a 3–0 victory. On 13 November 2022, Sychevoy scored his second RPL hat-trick in a 5–1 victory over FC Krasnodar and went into the 3.5-months-long league winter break on top of goalscoring table, tied with Quincy Promes at 14 goals.

On 25 December 2022, Sychevoy signed a 3.5-year contract with PFC Krylia Sovetov Samara, also changing his last name to Pisarsky.

International career
Sychevoy was called up to the Russia national football team for the first time in November 2022 for friendly games against Tajikistan and Uzbekistan. He made his debut against Tajikistan on 17 November 2022.

Personal life
He acquired citizenship of Russia in 2014 after the annexation of Crimea from Ukraine.

He changed his last name from Sychevoy (the last name of his biological father) to Pisarsky (the last name of his stepfather who raised him since young age) in December 2022.

Honours
Individual
Russian Premier League Player of the Month: October 2022

Career statistics

Club

International

References

External links
 Profile by Russian Football National League
 
 

1996 births
Sportspeople from Simferopol
Living people
Russian footballers
Russia international footballers
Ukrainian footballers
Ukrainian emigrants to Russia
Naturalised citizens of Russia
Russians in Ukraine
Association football forwards
FC Krymteplytsia Molodizhne players
FC Irtysh Omsk players
FC Orenburg players
PFC Krylia Sovetov Samara players
Crimean Premier League players
Russian First League players
Russian Premier League players